Kirillov's house (Russian: Дом кузнеца Кириллова) is a prominent naïve decorative building located in the village Kunara of Sverdlovsk region in Russia. The building is a private residential home constructed between 1954 and 1967 by Sergey Kirillov, a blacksmith of the village. The structure combines the outlines of a traditional Russian decorative house (terem) with rich colorful ornaments and visual elements suggestive of fairy tales, children art and Soviet propaganda imagery.

External links

http://outsider-environments.blogspot.com/2011/03/sergey-kirillov-decorated-house.html
http://www.art-insolite.com/envirmonde/russia/pages/sergeykirillov.htm
http://nashural.ru/Goroda_i_sela/kunara.htm

Visionary environments 
Houses in Russia
Cultural heritage monuments in Sverdlovsk Oblast